The New Zealand E class battery-electric locomotive represented the third unique type of locomotive class to be given the E classification in New Zealand. The first was the E class of nine Double Fairlie steam locomotives of 1872-75; the second E class consisted of a Mallet compound made in 1906; and as both were no longer operated by the New Zealand Railways in 1923, the classification was free to be used for a third time when the small battery-electric locomotive was delivered. This is the only time a classification has been used three times in New Zealand, though re-use happened a number of other times, arguably most notably when the A class of 1906 took the designation originally used by the A class of 1873.

Introduction 
This particular E class was ordered for service on the newly electrified Otira Tunnel section of the Midland line and was constructed in 1922.  In April 1923, English Electric delivered an order of six locomotives: five EO class mainline locomotives that collected electricity from overhead wires, and a sixth small battery-electric locomotive for maintenance duties.  It was classified as E 1, had a wheel arrangement of Bo-Bo-2 (including a 4-wheeled battery tender) under the UIC classification system, and worked for the rest of the 1920s.

Withdrawal 
The locomotive was written off around 1930 due to the costs involved in maintaining its batteries. Instructions were issued for any equipment that could not be re-used elsewhere from the locomotive to be dumped locally. E 1's cab can still be found alongside the track just south of Otira. The runner wagon for E 1 was stripped of its batteries and found use at Addington Workshops as a general-purpose wagon around the complex. E 1 consisted of a locomotive and a tender, each carrying 216 "Ironclad Exide" cells with a total capacity of 167,000 ampere-hours at 400 volts.

References

Citations

Bibliography

 Pioneer Electrics: A survey of railway electrification in the South Island. A J Pickering / I D Spicer (ed.). Tramway Historical Society : Christchurch, New Zealand : 1970.
 

E class (battery electric)
Bo-Bo locomotives
English Electric locomotives
3 ft 6 in gauge locomotives of New Zealand
Scrapped locomotives
Battery electric locomotives
Railway locomotives introduced in 1922